John Glassco (December 15, 1909 – January 29, 1981) was a Canadian poet, memoirist and novelist. According to Stephen Scobie, "Glassco will be remembered for his brilliant autobiography, his elegant, classical poems, and for his translations." He is also remembered by some for his erotica.

Life
Born in Montreal to a monied family, John Glassco (Buffy to his friends) was educated at Selwyn House School, Bishop's College School, Lower Canada College, and finally McGill University. At McGill he moved on the fringes of the Montreal Group of poets centred on that campus, which included F. R. Scott and A.J.M. Smith. Glassco wrote for the McGill Fortnightly Review with Scott, Smith, and Leon Edel.

Glassco left McGill without graduating to go to Paris with his friend, Graeme Taylor, when he was 17 years old. The two settled in the Montparnasse district of Paris which was then extremely popular amongst the literary intelligentsia. Their three-year stay formed the basis of Glassco's Memoirs of Montparnasse (1970), a description of expatriate life in Paris during the 1920s.

The book is presented as a genuine memoir, although Glassco had lightly fictionalized some aspects of the work. In it, he describes meeting various celebrities who were living in or passing through Paris at the time, such as James Joyce, Ernest Hemingway, Gertrude Stein, Alice B. Toklas, Ford Madox Ford, Frank Harris, Lord Alfred Douglas and others. In the notes to the republished edition in 2007 further characters are identified  as thinly disguised descriptions of Man Ray, Peggy Guggenheim and others.

Glassco, a bisexual, was, in the words of Leon Edel, "a bit frightened by certain kinds of women and nearly always delighted if he could establish a triangle."

In 1931 Glassco contracted tuberculosis. He returned to Canada and was hospitalized. In 1935, after having a lung removed, he retired to the town of Foster in Quebec's Eastern Townships. He served as mayor of Foster from 1952 to 1954.

Writing

Poetry
Glassco went on to earn a strong reputation as a poet. His Selected Poems won Canada's top honor for poetry, the Governor General's Award, in 1971. The Oxford Companion to Canadian Literature says of his poetry:

Translations
Glassco translated both poetry and fiction from French. He edited the 1970 anthology The Poetry of French Canada in Translation, in which he personally translated texts by 37 different poets. He also translated the work of three French-Canadian novelists: Monique Bosco (Lot's wife / La femme de Loth, 1975) Jean-Yves Soucy (Creature of the chase / Un dieu chasseur, 1979), and Jean-Charles Harvey (Fear's folly / Les demi-civilisés, 1982).

The Canadian Encyclopedia says that Glassco's "translations of French Canadian poetry are, along with F. R. Scott's, the finest yet to appear — his greatest achievement being the Complete Poems of Saint-Denys-Garneau (1975)."

Glassco also edited the 1965 anthology English poetry in Quebec, which originated from a poetry conference held in Foster in 1963.

Erotica
Glassco's long poem Squire Hardman, on the subject of flagellation, was privately printed in 1967.  The poem was inspired by The Rodiad (1871), falsely ascribed to George Colman the Younger, and Glassco continued the hoax by claiming that his own poem was a republication of an 18th-century original by Colman.  Glassco's The Temple of Pederasty, on the theme of sado-masochism and male homosexuality, was similarly ascribed to Ihara Saikaku with "translation" by the wholly fictitious "Hideki Okada". Glassco also used the pseudonym "Sylvia Bayer" to publish Fetish Girl, on the theme of rubber fetishism.  He wrote The English Governess (Ophelia Press, 1960) and Harriet Marwood, Governess (1967) under yet another pseudonym, "Miles Underwood".   Glassco completed the unfinished pornographic novel Under the Hill by Aubrey Beardsley, in an edition published by the Olympia Press in 1959.

Publications

Poetry
 The Deficit Made Flesh: Poems.  Toronto: McClelland & Stewart, 1958.
 A Point of Sky.  Toronto: Oxford University Press, 1964. ( Finalist, in 1965, of the Grand prix littéraire de Montréal)
 Selected Poems.  Toronto: Oxford University Press, 1971.
 Montreal.  Montreal: DC Books, 1973.
 Selected Poems with Three Notes on the Poetic Process.  Ottawa: Golden Dog Press, 1997.

Memoirs
 Memoirs of Montparnasse, Leon Edel intr. Toronto, New York: Oxford UP, 1970. Louis Begley intr. New York: New York Review Books Classics, 2007

Pornography
 and Aubrey Beardsley. Under the Hill; or the story of Venus and Tannhauser. Paris: Olympia, 1959.
The English Governess. as "Miles Underwood." Paris: Ophelia, 1960.
 Harriet Marwood, Governess. New York: Grove P, 1968.
 Fetish Girl. New York: Venus Library, 1971.
The Fatal Woman: Three Tales. Toronto: Anansi, 1974.

Translated
 Complete Poems of Saint-Denys Garneau. Ottawa: Oberon, 1975.

Edited
 English Poetry in Quebec, 1965.
 Poetry of French Canada in Translation. Toronto: Oxford UP, 1970.

See also

 Prix de la traduction John-Glassco, donated by the Literary Translators' Association of Canada
List of Bishop's College School alumni

Notes

References

External links
 Canadian Poetry: Studies/Documents/Reviews, No. 13 (Fall/Winter, 1983). In Memorabilia Mortis John Glassco (1909–1981).
 The English Governess, by "Miles Underwood"
 Archives of John Glassco (John Glassco fonds, R4070) are held at Library and Archives Canada

1909 births
1981 deaths
20th-century Canadian poets
20th-century Canadian male writers
Canadian male poets
20th-century Canadian novelists
Anglophone Quebec people
Bisexual men
Bishop's College School alumni
Canadian memoirists
Canadian male novelists
Governor General's Award-winning poets
Writers from Montreal
Bisexual memoirists
Canadian LGBT poets
Canadian LGBT novelists
McGill University alumni
Canadian male non-fiction writers
20th-century memoirists
20th-century Canadian LGBT people
Canadian bisexual writers
Bisexual novelists